"Anything" is a song composed and recorded by American R&B trio 3T, released as the first single from their debut album, Brotherhood (1995). The song peaked at number two on the UK Singles Chart and number 15 on the US Billboard Hot 100. It received a Gold Certification on January 26, 1996.

Critical reception
Gil L. Robertson IV from Cash Box named "Anything" a "standout track" of the Brotherhood album. Connie Johnson from Los Angeles Times felt the trio's potential is best realized on the song, describing it as "a ballad so yearningly tender that it makes the rest of the album pale by comparison." James Masterton for Dotmusic viewed it as "a perfectly creditable soul record". Alan Jones from Music Week wrote, "Though they had the obvious advantage of having Michael Jackson as an uncle, 3T's debut single "Anything" would have been a hit regardless."

Track listings
 CD single
 "Anything" (Single Edit With Acappella Intro) – 4:24
 "What Will It Take" – 5:16

 CD maxi
 "Anything" (Single Edit With Acappella Intro) – 4:24
 "Anything" (Cool Out Urban Mix) – 4:00
 "Anything" (2B3 Street Level Mix) – 4:32
 "Anything" (2B3 Instrumental Mix) – 4:33
 "Anything" (Misty Funk Mix) – 4:22
 "Anything" (Cory's R&B Smooth Mix) – 3:50

 12-inch maxi
 "Anything" (2B3 Street Level Mix) – 4:32
 "Anything" (2B3 Instrumental Mix) – 4:33
 "Anything" (Single Edit With Acappella Intro) – 4:24
 "Anything" (Misty Funk Mix) – 4:22
 "Anything" (Cool Out Urban Mix) – 4:00
 "Anything" (Cory's R&B Smooth Mix) – 3:50

Charts

Weekly charts

Year-end charts

Certifications

References

External links
 

1995 singles
1995 songs
3T songs